Nickelodeon Schweiz (branded as Nick Schweiz since 28 June 2017) is a Swiss German-language  pay television channel centred towards children. It was launched on 1 April 2009 timesharing with VIVA Switzerland, replacing the German feed that was available in Switzerland. The programming schedule is the same as Nickelodeon Germany feed, with commercial breaks from the country being replaced by local ads.

In March 2010, Nick was rebranded. From 1 January 2011 until 30 September 2014, Nickelodeon Switzerland timeshared with Comedy Central.

Before Nickelodeon Switzerland was launched as a TV channel it was a 7-hour programming block on the Swiss channel SF2 which used to broadcast from 28 September 1998 -16 September 2003 but was replaced by another programming block called Junior. 

Since 1 October 2021, the channel has been run by CH Media under license from Paramount, timesharing with the new channel 7+ Family.

Current programming
Nickelodeon Switzerland airs the same programming as Nickelodeon Germany and Austria the channel also airs a programming block called NickNight in evening hours which is also distributed in Austria & previously Germany.
 Beyblade Burst
 Fanboy & Chum Chum
 Breadwinners (Die Brot Piloten)
 Care Bears (2005–present/Germany)
 Danger Mouse
 The Fairly OddParents (Cosmo und Wanda – Wenn Elfen helfen)
 Get Blake! (Schnappt Blake!)
 Harvey Beaks (Harveys schnabelhafte Abenteuer)
 Pokémon
 Rabbids Invasion
 Sanjay and Craig (Sanjay und Craig)
 Sonic Boom
 SpongeBob SquarePants (SpongeBob Schwammkopf)
 Taz-Mania
 Teenage Mutant Ninja Turtles
 The Loud House (Willkommen bei den Louds)
 The Penguins of Madagascar (Die Pinguine aus Madagascar)
 Transformers Robots in Disguise (Transformers: Getarnte Roboter)
 Winx Club
 Yo-kai Watch
 Rainbow Butterfly Unicorn Kitty

See also

 Nickelodeon France, French-speaking version, also distributed in Switzerland
 List of Nickelodeon international channels
 Nickelodeon
 Nickelodeon Germany

References

External links 
 Nickelodeon on SF2
 The new version of Nickelodeon Swiss

Switzerland
Children's television networks
Television stations in Switzerland
Television channels and stations established in 2009
2009 establishments in Switzerland
German-language television stations
German-language television stations in Switzerland
1998 establishments in Switzerland
Television channels and stations established in 1998
2003 disestablishments in Switzerland
Television channels and stations disestablished in 2003